Abdurrahman Nafiz Gürman (1882; Bodrum - 6 February 1966; Istanbul) was an officer of the Ottoman Army and a general of the Turkish Army. After his retirement in 1949, he was Ambassador to South Korea and Iran, until 1959.

Works
Piyadenin Muharebesi
Piyade Takımının Muharegesi
Alman ve Fransız Harp Usulleri Arasındaki Fark ve Bizim Bundan Edeceğimiz İstifade
Piyade Neferi ve Mangası Muharebe İçin Nasıl Yetiştirilmeli
Piyade Takım ve Bölüğü Muharebe İçin Nasıl Yetiştirilmeli
1912-1913 Balkan Savaşında İşkodra Müdafaası
Büyük Harpte Kuzey Afrika'da Türkler
İstiklâl Harbinde 1 nci Piyade Tümeni

See also
List of high-ranking commanders of the Turkish War of Independence
List of Chiefs of the Turkish General Staff

Sources

External links
Chiefs of General Staff, Turkish General Staff.

Abdurrahman Nafiz GÜRMAN in the official website of the Turkish General Staff

1882 births
1966 deaths
People from Bodrum
People from Aidin vilayet
Ottoman Military Academy alumni
Ottoman Military College alumni
Ottoman Army officers
Ottoman military personnel of the Italo-Turkish War
Ottoman military personnel of the Balkan Wars
Ottoman military personnel of World War I
Ottoman prisoners of war
World War I prisoners of war held by Italy
Turkish military personnel of the Greco-Turkish War (1919–1922)
Turkish Army generals
Chiefs of the Turkish General Staff
Members of the Grand National Assembly of Turkey
Burials at Turkish State Cemetery
Recipients of the Liakat Medal
Recipients of the Iron Cross (1914)
Recipients of the Medal of Independence with Red Ribbon (Turkey)
Date of birth missing
Commanders of the Second Army of Turkey